Johnny Kidd may refer to:

 Johnny Kidd (singer) (1935–1966), vocalist for Johnny Kidd & the Pirates
 Johnny Kidd (wrestler) (born 1955), British professional wrestler

See also
 John Kidd (disambiguation)